"Vulcano" is a song performed by Italian singer Francesca Michielin. The three-minute song was released as a digital download on 21 July 2017 by Sony Music Entertainment. The song has peaked at number 44 on the Italian Singles Chart.

Background
In an interview with ANSA, she said, "Vulcano is an emblematic title that already makes sense in that there is something explosive in me and in my new way of making music, a volcano is something immediate, dirty and visceral, which at one point explodes."

Critical reception
William Lee Adams from Wiwibloggs described Vulcano as "play[ing] in the space between urban pop and tropical house, throbbing and pulsating with a heady mix of drum, piano, horns and more", concluding that "amid all the heat there’s a strong sense of cool, creating what may be her finest single yet."

Music video
An official music video to accompany the release of "Vulcano" was first released onto YouTube on 21 July 2017 at a total length of three minutes and seventeen seconds. It was directed by Giacomo Triglia and filmed in Berlin between 22:00 and 5:30. In the video, Michielin travels through the city and visits various locations including the subway, a photo booth and a nightclub.

Track listing

Charts

Certifications

Release history

References

2017 songs
2017 singles
Francesca Michielin songs
Songs written by Dario Faini